Lê Thu Thanh Hương (born 21 September 1991) is a Vietnamese footballer who plays as a forward for Phong Phú Hà Nam.

She also plays for Vietnam women's national futsal team since 2015

International goals
Scores and results list Vietnam's goal tally first.

External links 
 

1991 births
Living people
Women's association football forwards
Vietnamese women's footballers
Vietnam women's international footballers
Southeast Asian Games silver medalists for Vietnam
Southeast Asian Games medalists in football
Competitors at the 2013 Southeast Asian Games
Vietnamese women's futsal players
21st-century Vietnamese women
Competitors at the 2021 Southeast Asian Games